The Turks and Caicos Islands have participated at six Commonwealth Games. Their first appearance came in 1978, but they did not appear again for twenty years. They have attended every Games since 1998. To date, no athlete from the Turks and Caicos has won a Commonwealth medal.

References

 
Nations at the Commonwealth Games